Jiashan County is a county in the north of Zhejiang Province, bordering Shanghai to the northeast and Jiangsu province to the north. It is administered by the prefecture-level city of Jiaxing. The county seat is located on 126 People Avenue, Weitang Town.

The second campus of Sanda University, known as Guangbiao Institute, is located in Jiashan County.

History
Jiashan formerly was part of Jiaxing. In 1430, Jiashan was established.

On 1 November 2022, the county was named by a guideline of the National Development and Reform Commission (NDRC) as a "leading trial area" for common prosperity.

Administration divisions

Jiashan County consists of six towns, three subdistricts, 11 communities, 16 residential zones and 164 administrative villages.

Subdistricts
Weitang(Former Weitang, Lize, Fengnan)
Luoxing
Huimin(Former Huimin, Datong)

Towns
Northwest: Taozhuang(Former Taozhuang, Fenyu)
North: Xitang(Former Xitang, Dashun, Xiadianmiao)
Northeast: Yaozhuang(Former Yaozhuang, Dingzha, Yuhui)
Southwest: Tianning(Former Tianning, Hongxi, Yangmiao)
Centre: Ganyao(Former Ganyao, Fanjing)
South: Dayun

Climate

Economy

Transportation

Road
 G320
 Shen-Jia-Hu High Way
 Hu-Hang High Way
 Ping-Li County Road
 Chang-Jia High Way

Railway
 Hu-Kun Railway
 Hu-Hang High Railway

Water
 Hongqitang Canel
 Luxutang Canel
 Taipu River

Industry

Agriculture

Tourism

Culture

Education
 Jiashan Senior High School
 Jiashan Second Senior High School
 Jiashan High School

Notable people
Wu Zhen, a painter in Yuan Dynasty
Qian Nengxun, a premier of the Republic of China
Sun Daolin, a renowned Chinese actor
Huang Ju, Mayor and Party chief of Shanghai, Vice-Premier of the People's Republic of China

See also
 Xitang

References

External links
Website of Jiashan Government

County-level divisions of Zhejiang
Jiaxing